is a Japanese voice actor affiliated with Aoni Production. He won the Best Rookie Actor Award at the 7th Seiyu Awards and the Best Actors in Supporting Roles at the 15th Seiyu Awards.

Biography
On January 1, 2023, Shimazaki announced on Twitter that he had married a non-celebrity woman.

Filmography

Anime

Theatrical animation

Drama CD
Vanquish Brothers as Nobunaga
WRITERZ as Ran Hirukawa
Heart no Kakurega as Kawakura Haruto
Hana no Bakumatsu Koi Suru Cho as Soji Okita
Kiss x Kiss Vol.24 as Takashi Arimura
humANdroid Vol. 03 Type H as JOSHUAHeroic Spirit Lore Strange Tales ～ King of the Cavern Edmond Dantès ～ as Edmond Dantès Ikemen Vampire: Temptation in the Dark - as Napoleon Bonaparte

Video games
2010Gods Eater Burst (Federico Caruso)Fist of the North Star: Ken's Rage (younger Thouzer)

2011Suto*Mani: Strobe*Mania (Yayoi Saijo)

2013Dynasty Warriors 8 (Guan Xing)Geten no Hana (Mori Ranmaru)Super Robot Wars UX (Sun Quan/Sonken Gundam)

2014Atelier Shallie (Albert Perriend)Shining Resonance (Yuuma Irvan)God Eater 2: Rage Burst (Teruomi Makabe)Granblue Fantasy (Jamil)

2015Mobius Final Fantasy (Wol)BlazBlue: Central Fiction (Naoto Kurogane)Closers (Haruto Kaguragi)Fire Emblem Fates (Male Kamui/Corrin, Male Kanna)Xenoblade Chronicles X (HB)

2016Super Smash Bros. 4 (Male Kamui/Corrin's Japanese voice) (DLC)Fate/Grand Order (Arjuna, King of the Cavern Edmond Dantès, Protagonist)Super Robot Wars OG: Moon Dwellers (Touya Shiun)

2017Onmyōji (Yōko, Yōkinshi)Accel World vs. Sword Art Online: Millennium Twilight (Eugeo) (DLC)Sword Art Online: Hollow Realization (Eugeo) (DLC)Fire Emblem Heroes (Male Kamui/Corrin)Fire Emblem Warriors (Male Kamui/Corrin)Xenoblade Chronicles 2 (Akhos)Sengoku Night Blood (Akechi Mitsuhide)Ikemen Vampire: Temptation in the Dark (Napoleon Bonaparte)7'scarlet (Kagutsuchi Hino)

2018Dragalia Lost (Aldred, Barbatos)Samurai Love Ballad Party (Fujibayashi Sakuya)Warriors Orochi 4 (Guan Xing)

2019Astral Chain (Protagonist (Male), Akira Howard (Male))BlazBlue: Cross Tag Battle (Naoto Kurogane) (DLC)A Certain Magical Index: Imaginary Fest (Ollerus)Pokémon Masters EX (Burgh)

2020Disney: Twisted-Wonderland (Silver)Tetote Connect (Ashihara Yoshihara/Yuhata)Olympia Soirée (Riku)

2021Genshin Impact (Kaedehara Kazuha)Identity V (Andrew Kreiss)Arknights (Tequila)Samurai Warriors 5 (Nobunaga Oda)Alchemy Stars (Corax)Cookie Run: Kingdom (Clover Cookie)

2022Dragon Quest Treasures (Gustav, Monsters)

2023Sword Art Online: Last Recollection (Eugeo)

Dubbing
Live-action
 100 Things to Do Before High School (Fenwick Frazier (Jaheem King Toombs))Alita: Battle Angel (Hugo (Keean Johnson))Game of Thrones (Joffrey Baratheon (Jack Gleeson), Euron Greyjoy (Pilou Asbæk))The Kill Team (Andrew Briggman (Nat Wolff))Maurice (2019 Movie Plus edition) (Clive Durham (Hugh Grant))Mortal Engines (Tom Natsworthy (Robert Sheehan))

AnimationIce Age: Continental Drift (Gupta)Isle of Dogs (Editor Hiroshi)Mo Dao Zhu Shi'' (Wen Ning)

References

External links
  
  
 

1988 births
Living people
Aoni Production voice actors
Japanese male video game actors
Japanese male voice actors
Male voice actors from Miyagi Prefecture
People from Shiogama, Miyagi
21st-century Japanese male actors